Lieutenant general Valdemaras Rupšys (born 2 May 1967 in Šiauliai, Lithuania) is a Lithuanian military officer serving as the current Lithuanian Chief of Defence.

He began his military career in the Lithuanian Armed Forces on 1 November 1990. In 2005, he was appointed to serve at the General Jonas Žemaitis Military Academy of Lithuania. In 2011, he was appointed to lead the Mechanised Infantry Brigade Iron Wolf. In 2016, he was appointed to the position of the Commander of the Land Forces, with the rank of brigadier general granted to him by the decree of President Dalia Grybauskaitė. In November 2018, commemorating the 100th anniversary of the restoration of the Lithuanian Armed Forces, he was awarded the rank of Major General. On 25 July 2019, he became Chief of Defence under President Gitanas Nausėda.

References 

Lithuanian generals
1967 births
Living people